Espen Reinertsen (born 1979 in Gran, Norway) is a Norwegian saxophonist, flutist, composer, and music producer.

Biography 
Reinertsen released his debut solo album in 2015 on the label of Susanna Wallumrød, SusannaSonata. He followed up with the album Nattsyntese on the same label.

Honors 
 2010: De Unges Lindemanpris
 2014: The Trondheim Jazz Festival Talent Award
 2014: SpareBank 1 SMN JazZtipendiat

Discography

Solo albums 
 2015: Forgaflingspop (SusannaSonata)
 2017: Nattsyntese (SusannaSonata)

Collaborations 
 With Tetuzi Akiyama, Martin Taxt, Eivind Lønning
 2008: Varianter Av Døde Trær (Sofa)

 With Streifenjunko (Eivind Lønning duo)
 2009: No Longer Burning (Sofa)

 With Koboku Senjû (Toshimaru Nakamura, Tetuzi Akiyama, Eivind Lønning, Martin Taxt
 2010: Selektiv Hogst (Sofa)

References

External links 
 

1979 births
Living people
Norwegian jazz composers
Norwegian jazz saxophonists
21st-century saxophonists
People from Gran, Norway